Schiffweiler is a municipality in the district of Neunkirchen, in Saarland, Germany. It is situated approximately 5 km northwest of Neunkirchen, and 20 km northeast of Saarbrücken.

People from Schiffweiler 
 Konrad Grebe (1907–1972), German mining engineer and inventor of coal plow

References

Neunkirchen (German district)